The 2021 Independence Bowl was a college football bowl game played on December 18, 2021, and televised on ABC. It was the 45th edition of the Independence Bowl (after the 2020 edition was cancelled due to the COVID-19 pandemic), and was one of the 2021–22 bowl games concluding the 2021 FBS football season. Sponsored by engineering services company Radiance Technologies, the game was officially known as the Radiance Technologies Independence Bowl.

With kickoff scheduled for 3:30 p.m. EST (2:30 p.m. local CST), the start of the game was delayed approximately 12 minutes due to local weather conditions.

Teams
Consistent with conference tie-ins, the game was played between a Conference USA (C-USA) member, UAB, and BYU, an FBS independent.

This was the first matchup between UAB and BYU.

UAB Blazers

BYU Cougars

Game summary

Statistics

References

External links
 Game statistics at statbroadcast.com

Independence Bowl
Independence Bowl
BYU Cougars football bowl games
UAB Blazers football bowl games
Independence Bowl
Independence Bowl